The M-series truck was a pickup truck designed in the late 1930s by the Studebaker Corporation.

Production

The M-series Studebaker trucks came in several versions both pre and post WW II.  The M-5 was a 1/2 ton PU.  The M15 was the 3/4 ton version.  The M15A was the one & -ton version.  The M5, M15, and M15A all came with the Champion 169 ci. engine, only.  The M16 1-1/2 & 2 ton versions came with the more powerful Commander 226 ci. engine.  The Studebaker US6 version was produced during the war to government specifications; using a different nose and engine configuration, in both a 4x6 & 6x6 versions of a -ton truck.  In early 1945, Studebaker was given permission to produce some M Series trucks for civilian use.  These early post war civilian trucks used the Studebaker US6 cab with the government style swing out windshield.

Like most truck lines, the Studebaker M Series trucks could be had in any number of body styles.  Only pickup beds were offered on the M5, M15, & M15A versions from the factory; however, through several custom body manufacturers, any number of configurations could be had on all versions. A maybe little known fact is that the back and front fenders are interchangeable.

While the M16 version used the larger Commander 226 ci. engine, through the use of a different fire wall on these cabs, all the other front sheet metal stayed the same.  However, a spacer was used in the front fenders to accommodate the larger front wheel track of the M16.  

First put into production in November 1940, it saw extensive action during the Second World War, specifically in the South East Asian theatre against Japan. In particular, these Studebaker US6 version of the M-series Studebaker trucks were used in the construction of the Burma road. A large number of these trucks also served in the Russian forces as part of aid given to the country by the U.S.

Design and specifications

The M series sported a more aerodynamic shape than most trucks of the time, with easily recognisable "wind wing" vents on the driver and passenger windows, a feature not found on any other make of American truck during World War II. When Studebaker introduced the M-series pickup truck in 1941, the company used the Coupe Express name in advertising for a time; no M-series trucks were ever officially designated as the Coupe Express, though (not to be confused with the previous Studebaker Coupe Express of 1937–1939).

Notes

M-series truck